John Ronald Gibbons (8 April 1925 – 31 January 2021) was an English professional footballer who played as a centre forward.

Career
Born in Charlton, Gibbons played for Dartford, Queens Park Rangers, Ipswich Town, Tottenham Hotspur and Gravesend & Northfleet. He served in the British Army during the Second World War.

He died on 31 January 2021, aged 95, from COVID-19 during the COVID-19 pandemic in England. At the time he was Ipswich Town's oldest living player.

References

1925 births
2021 deaths
English footballers
Dartford F.C. players
Queens Park Rangers F.C. players
Ipswich Town F.C. players
Tottenham Hotspur F.C. players
Ebbsfleet United F.C. players
English Football League players
Association football forwards
Deaths from the COVID-19 pandemic in England
British Army personnel of World War II
People from Charlton, London
Footballers from Greater London